Dennis Michael Miller (born November 3, 1953) is an American political commentator, stand-up comedian, talk show host, actor, writer, and former sportscaster.

Miller was a cast member on the NBC sketch comedy series Saturday Night Live from 1985 to 1991, and he subsequently hosted a string of his own talk shows on HBO, CNBC, and also in syndication. From 2007 to 2015, Miller hosted a daily, three-hour, self-titled talk radio program, nationally syndicated by Westwood One. On March 9, 2020, Dennis Miller + One show, launched on RT America. It ran twice-weekly and featured celebrity interviews.

Miller is listed as 21st on Comedy Central's 100 greatest stand-up comedians of all time, and was ranked as the best host of SNLs Weekend Update by Vulture.com.

Early life
Miller was born in Pittsburgh and grew up in the suburb of Castle Shannon. He is of Scottish descent. Miller's parents separated and he was raised by his mother, Norma who was a dietitian at a Baptist nursing home. Miller is reluctant to speak about his father, usually just saying he "moved on when I was very young." He is the oldest of five children and in his early life often looked after the rest of his siblings.

Miller attended Saint Anne School, a Catholic elementary school. Growing up he was shy. His childhood pastimes included street football, backyard baseball, basketball at St. Anne's, and quite a bit of television. At St. Anne's he managed the Catholic Youth Organization basketball team for boys 15–16 years old. His first inspiration to pursue a comedy career came when as a child he was taken to see comedian Kelly Monteith at a Pittsburgh club. After the show Monteith was kind enough to answer the young Miller's questions about being a comedian, leaving him thinking "Man, I'm going to work hard at this... seems like fun."

Miller went to Keystone Oaks High School. His two earliest childhood comedy heroes were Jonathan Winters and Tim Conway. By high school he had already developed a reputation for humor. At Keystone Oaks, Miller was a member of the Physical Fitness Club, and in his senior year he worked on the Keynote newspaper and served on the student council, but lost his bid for senior class president. During his senior year, he served as co-emcee for the Keystone Oaks May Pageant, themed "Once Upon A Rumble Seat". Despite Miller's reputation for humor, his actual personality at this time was one that was reserved, lacking self-confidence, and hidden under a layer of comedy. He graduated from high school in 1971 with the intent of studying to become a sports writer.

At Point Park University Miller became a member of Sigma Tau Gamma fraternity. Miller likened his social status at this period as being lower than Booger of Revenge of the Nerds.

Miller majored in journalism. In the fall of his senior year at the university, he began writing for the South Hills Record, mixing humor into his sports reporting. When the paper changed its payment structure to pay around an eighth of a penny per column inch, he quit. He graduated from Point Park in 1976 with a degree in journalism. He later reflected, "I'm just not that interested in other people's business and that's a tragic flaw in a journalist."

Career 
After college Miller moved through several occupations, including a clerk at Giant Eagle deli, a janitor, a delivery man for a florist, and an ice cream scooper at the Village Dairy. Reflecting on his pre-comedy job history in a later discussion with Tom Snyder, he recalled leaving college and attending a real estate seminar at a "bad hotel," which consisted of a five-hour lecture without bathroom breaks. Near the end of the lecture, he was told that he would only be paid by commission, which made Miller say "I'm in Hell, I don't even know what I am going to do for a living here. I'm a nut case." Miller then worked as a delivery man for what he describes as "an all-gay florist." Leaving that job, he worked as an ice cream scooper. Miller recalled that he was twenty-one—five years out of high school and wearing a paper hat while working alongside teens excited about getting their driver's licenses. A spur to quit the ice cream scooping job was when the prettiest girl he had attended high school with came in and he was the one who had to take her order, which filled him with embarrassment. Miller later said that at the time he feared that if he stayed in such jobs, his life would become a Franz Kafka novella, and it stiffened his resolve to start pursuing a comedy career.

Leaving the ice cream parlor Miller joined the staff at Point Park's Recreation Room, where he was in charge of the bowling alley, video games, and running the air-hockey league. Air-hockey regulars nicknamed him "Clarence" after NHL Commissioner Clarence Campbell, or called him "Commish." When Miller's brother Jimmy was around, they referred to him as "Commush". A patron from that time recalled that Miller sat on pool tables telling jokes and honing his comedy to those in the rec room, which was the only place the commuters gathered. Miller and the other patrons closely followed the NFL at the time as it was the "era of the Super Steelers".

Stand-up
In 1979, after seeing a Robin Williams comedy special on HBO, Miller began to pursue his dream of being a stand-up comedian.

In Pittsburgh, Miller began a comedy career by performing at open-mic nights. He backed out of his first two attempts to perform at an open mic due to stage fright and anger with himself over the question of whether the drive to perform was a need for approval from others. When he finally made his début at the Oak's Lounge on Sleepy Hollow Road in Castle Shannon, most of Miller's family was in the audience to cheer him on.

In a later interview Miller spoke of the stage presence he developed for his stand-up act to address his fears. (He emphasized that the comedy business will always be frightening as any error could spiral into the end of a career.) To compensate for his early fears, Miller said, "I got up there and acted like the guy I always wanted to be to get through it. ...It's a part of me, but it's not the real me." He kept his hands in his pockets to appear unfazed, or adjusted his cuffs during an audience laugh to give the appearance of indifference to approval. Miller pointed out that part of his act is to show a "hipper-than-thou" persona, but then purposely undermine it at regular intervals for comedic effect.

He began appearing onstage at the Oak's Lounge in Castle Shannon while working at the Giant Eagle deli in Kennedy. Miller lived without a car and without much money in the Oakland neighborhood of Pittsburgh, hitching rides or taking buses. He continued to do stand-ups in Oakland and at places like Brandy's in the Strip District and the Portfolio on Craig Street, eventually saving up $1,000 which he used to try to fast-track his comedy career by moving to New York City. Once there, Miller had to bribe a landlord to give him a room for $200, then had to pay the security deposit of $250 and the first month's rent of $250. Thus, he spent $700 of his $1,000 savings on his first day in New York, for a sparse, bunker-like room.

While in New York he submitted a joke for a Playboy magazine contest for humor writing that was judged by an all-star panel including Rodney Dangerfield, Bill Cosby, David Brenner, Martin Mull, Art Buchwald, and Buck Henry. Of around 15,000 entries, Miller tied for second and his joke and picture appeared in the June 1979 issue of the magazine. Miller won $500 in Playboys first annual humor competition with the following joke:

For the first year and a half of his comedy career, Miller had heavily relied on props during his act, but he felt this limited him and switched to using purely language.

Miller gained more exposure when he tried out for the New York Laff-Off Contest. The contest had 40 slots but 32 of them had already been filled by the top regulars who appeared at the three comedy venues sponsoring the competition. Some 350 people tried out for the remaining eight slots, some of whom had appeared on The Tonight Show Starring Johnny Carson, The Merv Griffin Show, or The Mike Douglas Show. Many of the comedians Miller was up against had hours of crafted material, while he had fine-tuned around ten minutes. To his surprise and delight, Miller earned one of the remaining slots. For the competition itself he appeared at the Improv and received a standing ovation, moving him on to the finals. While he lost the Laff-Off, he was seen by dozens of talent agents, resulting in bookings at colleges and other clubs.

While he was working in New York City, Hustler Magazine listed Miller in a piece called "The 10 Funniest People in America You'll Never See on TV".

While in New York City Miller supported himself by working day jobs such as bartender and payroll clerk, and by night made the rounds of New York clubs The Comic Strip, The Improvisation, and Catch a Rising Star. After about a year, he returned to Pittsburgh.

Television
Having honed his stand-up comedy act, Miller transitioned to television, increasing his audience base.

KDKA-TV
Having gone through the comedy-club circuit, Miller returned to do his sight-gag routine back in Pittsburgh at Brandy's in August 1980. It was there that local television station KDKA-TV was shooting a piece for its Evening Magazine and offered him a job at the station. By the end of 1980 Miller was acting as a warm-up in the afternoons for KDKA's Pittsburgh 2Day. He then began starring in humorous segments for the syndicated Evening Magazine. By 1983 he had become the host of Punchline, a Saturday-morning newsmagazine aimed at teenagers. In one episode he interviewed fellow comedian Pat Paulsen. Miller later reflected on this time, saying that "you have to start somewhere," and that he was "just pleased to be in front of a camera."

During this time Miller also performed stand-up in such New York City comedy clubs as Catch A Rising Star and The Comic Strip. While in New York, Miller saw a show by Richard Belzer and noted how he barked at the crowd rather than embrace it, was cutting rather than cute. Miller adopted this comedic philosophy.

During performances at comedy clubs in Pittsburgh, Miller befriended Jay Leno and Jerry Seinfeld. In 1984 Leno found Miller an apartment in Los Angeles and he and Seinfeld arranged a debut for Miller at The Improv. Miller resigned from KDKA and moved to Los Angeles to try to further his comedy career.

Miller's brothers Rich and Jimmy joined him in Los Angeles, taking up varied jobs around The Improv such as booking shows, acting as bouncer, and selling tickets. Jimmy became a power talent agent with Gold Miller, and Rich ran RCM Entertainment, booking comedians across the country.

In Los Angeles, Leno was a big influence on Miller, as he was to many upcoming comedians in the area at the time. Young comedians gathered at Leno's home late at night and he offered critiques with humorous, biting wit. Leno also taped television appearances of his group and showed them during such sessions while offering more humorous critiques. Miller later fondly recalled the time, saying it was like "sitting at his knee, querying Yoda".

Miller appeared on Star Search, where he lost out to fellow comedian Sinbad after the two tied on judges' scores; Sinbad won with a higher studio-audience approval rating. Miller made his first appearance on Late Night with David Letterman on June 24, 1985 (other guests were Phil Collins and María Conchita Alonso).

Saturday Night Live
Miller's big break came in 1985, when he was discovered by Lorne Michaels at The Comedy Store. Miller subsequently auditioned for SNL in Los Angeles, and did well enough for a second audition at Times Square in New York. About 70 people watched this second audition—this was most of the show's staff along with Lorne Michaels, Paul Simon, and Dan Aykroyd. Miller walked into a well-lit room and was told "Go ahead, you have eight minutes, Dennis." After the New York audition he went to dinner with Michaels and Jack Nicholson. Miller felt that this was just another aspect of his audition, to see if he could handle himself around famous people, so he "just sat there quietly".

Miller later recalled the conclusion of the meeting with Michaels: "He looked at me and goes, 'Would you like to do my newscast?'. And I said, 'Yeah, I would', and he said, 'Well, I'll see you tomorrow'. And then I walked out. And I remember thinking, 'My life has just changed.'" Miller had landed a spot on Saturday Night Live, where he succeeded Christopher Guest as the Weekend Update anchor. The spot was supposed to go to comic Jon Lovitz, but Lovitz was scheduled for other parts on the show and needed the Update segment to do costume changes, so Miller was drafted to read the news. His comedy was apolitical before SNL but politics came easy through opening a newspaper and building a new act around a few headlines. He made his stage persona a bit sardonic, as he noticed people who had done the Weekend Update segment as nice guys quickly lost the role.

Miller began his fictional news reports with "Good evening, and what can I tell ya?" and closed with "Guess what, folks? That's the news, and I... am... outta here!" Fans of SNL became accustomed to his snarky delivery, high-pitched giggle, and frequently primped hair—idiosyncrasies that were spoofed by Dana Carvey, Tom Hanks, and Jimmy Fallon, all of whom have impersonated Miller on the show. When Miller left SNL in 1991, the anchor's chair was turned over to Kevin Nealon.

In 1988, Miller released a stand-up comedy album, The Off-White Album, derived from an HBO special titled Mr. Miller Goes to Washington, which drew heavily from the observational and metaphor-driven style he was known for on Saturday Night Live, and showed glimpses of the political humor that influenced his later work. An HBO special, Dennis Miller: Black and White, aired shortly after the release of the CD.

Although Miller spent much of his time on SNL behind the Weekend Update desk, he was included in some sketches and did a few recurring characters and celebrity impersonations.

Recurring characters
 Koko, one of the pixies in the recurring sketch "Miss Connie's Fable Nook"
 Steve, one of The Stand-Ups (others include Jon Lovitz as Bob, Damon Wayans as Keith, and Tom Hanks as Paul)

Celebrity impersonations
 Gary Hart
 George Harrison
 Nathaniel Crosby

It was thought that he would renew his contract with NBC until at least 1993.

Leaving SNL
Miller left SNL after the 1990–91 season despite being happy with his role on the show, and despite loving writing political gags for it, because he had turned 38 and his 18-month-old son Holden had made him want to strive for things to "make the boy proud." He had a late-night talk show in development, and it was believed that fans of Letterman would naturally be interested in Miller's show and prefer that over Leno's in that time slot.  He told an interviewer, "I had a great gig and this came up. It seemed like an opportunity that doesn't present itself too frequently in your life, so I opted to take it. ...I wanted to see what other talents I had, so I decided this was the shot." Miller thought that his outspokenness behind the SNL desk on political topics and even on jokes not working out made the transition to talk show host a good idea. He also felt that the SNL studio audience never fully accepted him in skits as other characters, making him question his acting ability.

After it was announced that Miller would  start his own show, he was a guest on The Tonight Show with Johnny Carson. Carson offered him some advice while reflecting on his own 30-year career from which he was retiring in May 1992. He told Miller to compete only with himself, not the competition. He appreciated the advice, noting "there's no class for this" and that he would have to learn on the job in front of an audience. In preparation, Miller sharpened his interviewing skills by practicing on the show's stage hands. He felt that the secret to interviewing well was listening to the guest rather than trying to set up jokes while the guest is talking.

As the date for the show's opening approached, Miller told an interviewer that he was both thrilled and "scared shitless" by the opportunity. He hoped to eventually relax enough to be entirely himself. He saw Carson's approach as the standard but hoped to be original. Between SNL and his new show, he did stand-up shows with Howie Mandel and Steven Wright.

The Dennis Miller Show

In 1992, after leaving SNL, Miller hosted an eponymous late-night talk show in syndication that lasted seven months. Launched in January 1992, it was an attempt by syndicator Tribune Entertainment to carve out a niche in the late-night television landscape after Carson's retirement from The Tonight Show that May and his replacement by Jay Leno. The Dennis Miller Show built an insignificant audience and was cancelled in July.

Dennis Miller Live
Beginning in 1994, Miller hosted Dennis Miller Live, a half-hour talk show on HBO. The show's theme song was the Tears for Fears hit "Everybody Wants to Rule the World", and included a snippet of the song "Civilized" by the Rollins Band.
The show was taped at CBS Television City on the same stage where The Price Is Right is taped. It utilized a small set, sparse lighting, no band and Miller speaking to the largely-unseen studio audience from a darkened stage.

Miller hosted one guest per show, with whom he discussed the topic of the day. Early on, guests were all interviewed live via satellite, but soon most appeared live in the studio. There was also a call-in segment. The number was originally given as 1-800-LACTOSE. Later, he referred to it only by its numeric equivalent (1-800-522-8673). Within the time available, Miller typically could accommodate only two or three calls. He gradually eliminated call-ins in the last few seasons of the show.

Miller and his writing staff won five Emmy Awards during the show's run, which aired 215 episodes over nine years. HBO cancelled the show in 2002.

Monday Night Football
With the increasing popularity of cable television and its multiple channel and programming options, ABC's Monday Night Football found itself competing for viewers. One of its main competitors for its target young male demographic was professional wrestling.

ABC went through a series of different announcer combinations in rapid succession, trying to establish a booth dynamic that would recapture the public's imagination. By the close of the 1999 season, they were looking to make the fourth change in as many years. By the end of the 1999 NFL season, Monday Night Football had its ratings decline for the fifth season in a row. In an effort to turn things around, ABC fired Boomer Esiason, who had been on the show for two years. They also convinced Don Ohlmeyer, who had produced the show in the 1970s, to come out of retirement and gave him the authority to pick his own announcers. ABC Sports President Howard Katz told The Associated Press he felt "Monday Night Football was not as special as it used to be, and that's why we've taken the dramatic steps we've taken. We wanted to remove some of the sameness. We wanted to reinvent a little bit." Elsewhere Katz said "It may not work. We may find out that this is a bad idea. But I love taking the risk." Ohlmeyer set out to try and recapture the viewer excitement of the Howard Cosell and Don Meredith era.

ABC told the AP that each open position had around twenty viable candidates vying for it, who auditioned by sitting with Al Michaels (whom ABC had retained) and 'calling' the previous season AFC playoff game between Tennessee and Buffalo. Miller auditioned on June 12, 2000, sitting with Michaels in a Los Angeles studio to do such a mock broadcast. Miller's NFL knowledge surprised those in attendance. He had grown up watching the 1970s championship Steelers and was an avid watcher of the NFL draft. He had even inquired about an announcing job with Fox after they had acquired rights to show NFL games in 1994. Michaels later told an interviewer, "It was way beyond what we expected. I had no idea that he knew as much about football as he did. He made points that other analysts we brought in never made, and his points were more salient, more interesting, and better stated. He was giving his riff, analyzing the plays and providing the humor. Amazing would not be an overstatement. Then I thought, Maybe he's shooting his wad here, and that's all we're going to get. But he kept going. Hell, it was almost perfect. Don and I looked at each other and said, 'Wow. Where did this come from?'"

ABC told Sports Illustrated about the three-month process Ohlmeyer went through, including going through hundreds of tapes, slimming down to 40 candidates, and conducting 20 auditions (which included Jimmy Johnson, Bill Parcells, Steve Young, and John Elway). The Los Angeles Times noted that ESPN's Sterling Sharpe appeared to have been ABC's first choice but he had refused to return phone calls to ABC. Ohlmeyer had considered Miller early in the process, more as offering a rant segment within the broadcast, but he began to think of him in an expanded role.

By late June 2000, it was announced that Miller had beaten out Rush Limbaugh and Tony Kornheiser (among others) for a job as color commentator on ABC's Monday Night Football. The Los Angeles Times called Miller's hiring "one of the boldest moves in sports television history," and noted that Miller, like Cosell, was "someone who is loved and hated," a person seen by some "as brilliant and witty; others see him as smug, pompous, and obnoxious." Show producer Ohlmeyer explained his thinking about hiring Miller: "Football is not played in St. Patrick's Cathedral. People watch football to have some fun. We want a telecast that's relevant, successful, and unpredictable. If it doesn't work out, no amount of buzz will save us." Miller praised the producer, saying "I admire Ohlmeyer's cojones ... I think I'm a pretty quirky hire. I admire him for that."

After the announcement, Miller appeared on the July 3, 2000, cover of Sports Illustrated with the title "Can Dennis Miller Save 'Monday Night Football?'" Miller told reporters that he would not try to dominate the show. He and Ohlmeyer said his role would not be that of a comedian. Miller stated, "I'm going to try to stay in the background and ask questions a fan would ask. The rants are my HBO show and I won't try to recreate that. I'm going to try to integrate myself in a three-man scheme."

Miller and the new broadcasting team (hold-over Al Michaels on play-by-play, Dan Fouts as analyst, and Eric Dickerson with Melissa Stark reporting from the sidelines) began airing through the preseason, starting on July 31, 2000, in the preseason Hall of Fame Game between the New England Patriots and the San Francisco 49ers. The show's official season opener was on September 4, 2000, with the Denver Broncos at the defending Super Bowl champion St. Louis Rams. Miller's performance at the official opener was met with mixed reviews. AP and The Boston Globe held that Miller had improved from preseason, but The Washington Times said he "comes off as being a smug, smarmy, smirking sort," and The Toronto Star suggested, "Send Miller back to the Comedy Channel. ... This guy just isn't very good."

Throughout Miller's football coverage his commentary was sprinkled with esoteric references. A common Miller-ism was after a Hail Mary pass fell incomplete, he would say "Hail Mary is denied—separation of church and state." He also once referred to "The Greatest Show on Turf"—the St. Louis Rams receiving corps—as the "Murderer's Row of Haste." Online options arose to offer definitions to references made by Miller on Monday Night Football: a website called "Dennis Miller Demystified," Encyclopædia Britannicas "Annotated Dennis Miller," and the Shadowpack (a "content aggregator, formatter, and e-commerce app") giving real-time explanations on personal digital assistant. Miller stated he was flattered by such attention.

As his first season progressed, Miller's critics held that "he sounds scripted." The show's ratings continued to decline; in 2001 the show had 16.8 million viewers, down from 18.5 million the year before and below the 19.4 million of pre-Miller 1999. As the ratings did not improve, writers from Newsweek and USA Today began openly calling for Miller to be let go. Despite the questionable ratings, Miller and Fouts signed a contract for a third year.

Despite having hired Miller and Fouts for another year, ABC began negotiations with veteran football commentator John Madden. Madden had worked at Fox Sports for eight years since the network had won the contract for the NFC Conference games away from CBS in 1998. Since getting the NFL contract, Fox had lost $4.4 billion (losing $387 million due to the contract in 2001 alone), and was looking to cut programming costs. Madden's contract for the next year would cost Fox $8 million so, when ABC was approaching Madden, Fox agreed to let him out of his remaining year. Despite having been hired for another year, Miller and Fouts were replaced by Madden, who was signed on February 28, 2002, for $5 million a year for four years. (Fouts remained with ABC, being moved to cover college football; Miller and Eric Dickerson were let go.)

Miller later reflected, "The football thing was fun for me. I was in the middle of a maelstrom and I just decided not to pay attention to it because, for me, getting hired was a freakish act of nature. I had never gone to a football game. ... I remember the day I heard that John Madden had quit Fox [and] I remember calling Dan Fouts that afternoon and saying, 'Get ready, babe, we're getting whacked.' ... I don't have any hard feelings." Elsewhere he said, "As soon as Madden left Fox, I pretty much knew I was going to be whacked. Here was Madden, the Pliny the Elder of football announcers. And they were going to stay with the kid? I was having fun. I had alienated half the community, and probably half of them liked me. Which is pretty much my batting average. I began to see maybe a decade ago that my career was never going to be in complete approval. I wasn't endearing." When asked about "the Dennis Miller experiment," Madden told Sports Illustrated that he thought people tuned into Monday Night to view the game and not entertainment; "If I go to watch a comedian, I don't expect a football game to break out." Al Michaels, while overjoyed to work with Madden, praised Miller, saying, "what he tried to do was the hardest thing ever attempted in broadcasting. No other non-football person or someone of that ilk could have pulled it off as well as he did."

In 2010, TV Guide Network listed Miller's stint at No. 12 on their list of 25 Biggest TV Blunders, while Awful Announcing put him at No. 1 in their list of the Top 10 Sports Media Busts. Fellow talk show host Johnny Carson wrote for New Yorker Magazine a parody about Dennis Miller's new role at that time of being a sport announcer, Proverbs of Dennis Miller.

CNBC show
E! News later reported that MSNBC had considered Miller for a 2002 prime-time talk show, but instead went with Phil Donahue.

By 2003, Miller began providing regular commentary for the Fox News show Hannity & Colmes. E! News reported that he was a serious candidate to provide commentary on the show, but the deal did not go through for unknown reasons.

CNBC had seen a slide in its ratings since Brian Williams was moved to NBC to replace retiring Tom Brokaw in its NBC Nightly News. The network had not had a well-known personality in its prime-time lineup since the departure of Geraldo Rivera for Fox News in 2001. The nighttime audience for CNBC was smaller than its cable competitors, causing the network to look for a new direction. While it had been showing mostly business-oriented talk shows, such as Kudlow & Cramer and Capital Report, NBC Entertainment president Jeff Zucker approached Miller with an offer to do a prime-time political show weeknights in CNBC's 9 p.m. (ET) slot, which placed him against Fox's Bill O'Reilly.

Miller accepted the offer and the show, produced by NBC Studios, began on January 26, 2004, called, simply, Dennis Miller. CNBC announced that they were "comfortable with an unabashed Bush fan in the middle of its prime-time schedule in an election year." Their president Pamela Thomas-Graham said, "When we hired Dennis, we knew exactly what his political beliefs were and his viewers will hear them. The reason we hired him is we think he's witty, smart and interesting. He's part of a lineup. He's not the only person in the lineup." She contrasted his political leanings to that of John McEnroe's, whose own talk show followed Miller's in the lineup. The group Fairness and Accuracy in Reporting objected that one of the show's producers was Mike Murphy, who was an adviser to Governor Arnold Schwarzenegger (Miller's first guest on the show), and charged that CNBC was setting up a conflict of interest.

Miller promised to serve as "'an ombudsman' who will tell it like it is and become 'incensed' on the viewer's behalf". Stylistically Miller was seen by some as "attempting to be serious, angry, and funny all at the same time," and the show was compared to that of Bill Maher. When asked if he had the credentials to do a quasi-news show, Miller stressed he was an entertainer. "I don't have credibility, I'm a comedian. I'm not Ed Murrow up on the roof in a London Fog reporting on the Blitz."

In the beginning of the series, Miller had a chimpanzee on the show named Ellie, who was declared a "consultant." After a few appearances Ellie was replaced by a smaller, friendlier chimp named Mo. Reviewers theorized Ellie was let go "perhaps because she pressed the Howard Dean 'scream' button on Miller's desk one too many times." Mo was noted for swinging across the studio on a rope, doing somersaults on the sofa while giving the appearance of reading Variety, and for nuzzling Miller while he gave his monologue. Miller appeared to enjoy Mo's presence and his personality.

The hour-long show contained a daily news segment called "The Daily Rorschach," which were wordy riffs on news events, reminiscent of his role on SNL's Weekend Update and his HBO show. Reviewers felt Miller's riffs would benefit from a live audience, and the show incorporated a "nightclub-style audience of 100 or so" beginning on March 9, 2004. A sign giving out the toll-free telephone number to order tickets was held up by Mo.

For the first half of the show Miller interviewed someone about a particular news item. L.A. Weekly remarked, "Miller may be up front about his own political affiliation, even to the point of shilling for the Republicans, but despite his increasingly aggressive America-first humor, he is unusually evenhanded in his selection of guests." Miller had laid out his vision for such interviews before the show began airing, telling The Associated Press, "I don't want it to be a screaming shriekfest. I want it to be a pretty reasoned discourse. I don't care what Gary Coleman thinks about Afghanistan, which to me was the flaw of 'Politically Correct' towards the end."

For its second half, the show also featured a panel discussion dubbed "The Varsity," which offered a wide variety of political viewpoints on current topics. Frequent "Varsity" panelists included Ed Schultz, Gloria Allred, Willie Brown, David Horowitz, Mickey Kaus, Steven Katz, Lawrence O'Donnell, Phil Hendrie, and Harry Shearer. In these segments, Miller acted "less like a host than a fellow conversationalist, and seems as happy to listen as to interrupt. But he does get in a few wisecracks." Miller was praised by LA Weekly for approaching the panel in a "relatively relaxed and straightforward attitude." Despite having "worked briefly as a commentator for Hannity and Colmes on Fox, he's far from being a Murdochian attack dog, and he often sits there and sucks it up while people tell him just how awful the administration of his beloved commander-in-chief really is. ... Miller, it turns out, is considerably more interested in 'diversity' than some of his liberal counterparts."

Fellow SNL alum Tim Meadows and Last Comic Standings Ant portrayed humorous field correspondents which served as a break between the political humor.

The show was openly pro-President George W. Bush, and it debuted at the same time that John Kerry had become the Democratic front-runner. The inability to find weapons of mass destruction in Iraq, a budget that was seen as out of control, and a resentment over the President's tough-talking cowboy image had all caused a major decline in President Bush's approval numbers. While Miller's rating started out well with his first episode interviewing his friend Schwarzenegger (The New York Times put the figure at 746,000 people, which was a big number in the eyes of CNBC), by March 2004 his numbers had slipped to 300,000. This was in contrasted to The Daily Show with Jon Stewart, which attracted 1.9 million viewers, and which aired at the later time slot of 11 pm.

By April 2005, Miller's viewership had declined to 107,000 (a 59% drop from the year before). CNBC canceled the show in May 2005 as part of the network's move to refocus on financial news (airings of Late Night with Conan O'Brien and shows hosted by John McEnroe and Tina Brown were also cancelled). Miller's show was replaced with a second airing of Mad Money with Jim Cramer.

Guest appearances and commercials
Miller has appeared as a guest or guest star on various shows, including Boston Public, The Daily Show, Hannity & Colmes, NewsRadio, The O'Reilly Factor, The Norm Show, Real Time with Bill Maher, SportsCenter, Diners, Drive-Ins and Dives, and late-night talk shows The Tonight Show with Jay Leno, Late Night with David Letterman, The Late Late Show with Craig Ferguson, and WWE Raw.

Miller hosted the MTV Video Music Awards in 1995 and 1996. He was also the host of HBO's 1996 series of election specials, Not Necessarily the Election.

In 2003, he made a guest appearance on the Cartoon Network Adult Swim show Space Ghost Coast to Coast.

In May 2017, Miller hosted a month-long series of monster movies on Turner Classic Movies. He appeared in wraparounds on the channel, discussing such films as Creature from the Black Lagoon and The Deadly Mantis.

He has appeared in various television commercials, serving as a spokesman for M&M's candies, 10-10-220 long-distance service, Miller beer, and the Internet service provider NetZero. About these activities he has remarked: "Everybody has to sell out at some point to make a living. I'm a family man. I sold out to make an M&M commercial. They offer incredible amounts of money, and I say, 'What can I do to sell one more piece of candy for you? Do you want me to hug the M&M?'" Miller also did a short B2B commercial for Blockbuster/IBM partnership company, New Leaf Entertainment. On February 27, 2012, Miller guest starred on Hawaii 5-0 in the episode "Lekio," alongside guest star James Caan.

Return to Fox News
On September 21, 2006, Miller returned to Fox News with a two-and-a-half-minute commentary on illegal immigration during his "Real Free Speech" segment on Hannity & Colmes. He appeared on 13 of the 17 aired episodes of the comedy show The 1/2 Hour News Hour. He had a weekly segment called "Miller Time" on The O'Reilly Factor, and has also appeared on Red Eye w/ Greg Gutfeld under the pseudonym "Mansquito," a name Miller has pledged to use on future appearances on the network.

Game shows
Miller co-hosted the game show Grand Slam, which aired on GSN in 2007.

For one month, Miller hosted Amne$ia for NBC. The show was a replacement program commissioned during the 2007–08 Writers Guild of America strike and was canceled once the strike was resolved and scripted programming returned to the network.

Sports Unfiltered on Versus
In November 2007, Versus tapped Miller to host Sports Unfiltered, a weekly one-hour sports talk show. It was canceled after eight episodes.

Dennis Miller + One
Miller hosted Dennis Miller + One, on RT America, a channel funded by the Russian government, from March 9, 2020, until early 2022. The half-hour program was produced by Ora TV and aired twice weekly, featuring interviews with sports and entertainment celebrities. In line with the name of the show, Miller interviewed a single guest for the entire half hour. The show replaced Larry King Now, on which Miller had been a frequent guest host until King's death in February 2021. In February 2022, Miller quit the show due to the Russian invasion of Ukraine, shortly before RT withdrew from the American market in March.

Radio career
The Dennis Miller Show
In January 2007, Miller signed a deal with Westwood One (later acquired by Dial Global, which rebranded itself as Westwood One) to launch The Dennis Miller Show, a weekday three-hour talk radio program. The program debuted on March 26, 2007, and ran through February 27, 2015. The show's website provided a live stream of the broadcast. The site also made archives of all shows available in MP3 format. The live feed was free, but a subscription to the Dennis Miller Zone (DMZ) was required in order to access archived broadcasts. The show aired on 250+ stations, airing on tape delay on some of those stations between 6–9 pm ET and 9 pm-12 am ET. Salem stations also aired a "best of" Miller show on Saturdays. His on-air sidekick "Salman" (David S. Weiss) also wrote for Dennis Miller Live. His producer Christian Bladt previously appeared on-camera as dozens of different characters during the "Daily Rorschach" segment on his CNBC television show.

Miller's program included serious discussions about American culture, current events, politics, and their place in the global context. The show was infused with Miller's sarcasm, which is often characterized by obscure pop culture references. For example, each hour of the show opened with an arcane reference. The first hour's opening phrase was a combination of dialogue from the film Thank You for Smoking and a U.S. space program slogan coined by Alan Shepard: "What's up, Hiroshi? Let's light this candle!" Miller's other opening phrases for his second and third hours respectively were "Come to me my babies, let me quell your pain", (Powers Boothe as Jim Jones in Guyana Tragedy: The Story of Jim Jones) and "ABC – Always be c'''losing if you want the knife set" (from Glengarry Glen Ross).

Most shows featured three guests (one per hour), mostly from the world of politics and entertainment, as well as calls from listeners. Guests included fellow comedians and SNL alumni (such as Dana Carvey and Jon Lovitz), pundits and authors such as Ann Coulter, Aaron Klein and Mark Steyn (while the show's guest list leaned right of center, there were several liberals who appeared on the show, such as Dennis Kucinich and Alan Dershowitz), Presidential candidates, several sports commentators, and some "regulars" like columnists and conservatives Debra Saunders, Charles Krauthammer, Victor Davis Hanson, John Bolton, Bill Kristol, and Jerome Corsi along with entertainers such as singer Peter Noone of Herman's Hermits and actor Orson Bean. Miller generally took calls every hour, and in addition to comments about culture and politics, Miller encouraged humorous callers and often commented on their comedic delivery. A segment on Fridays was set aside for "Dennis Ex Machina", his term for a segment without a guest, where he allowed phone calls on any topic.

In a 2007 interview Miller said he felt that his radio show of all his work best represented his actual unvarnished views, saying "This time, if I'm fired, they will be firing the real Dennis Miller."

According to Talkers Magazine, as of spring 2011, Miller's show had an estimated 2,250,000 weekly listeners. Miller and Dial Global signed an agreement in early 2012 to continue his show for three years. Miller ended the radio show after his contract expired on March 27, 2015.

Eventually Dennis joined the podcasting world with "The Dennis Miller Option" which was a sort of continuation of his old radio show, albeit only for an hour weekly. It featured interviews with some of the same guests from the radio days, emails from listeners, and the usual Miller rants. He decided to retire from the show after the Elections in 2020 as he felt that the political climate had become too divisive.

Other endeavors
Miller periodically performs stand-up at the Orleans Hotel & Casino in Las Vegas. In recent appearances he has done a mix of his old and new material, with some political jokes as well.

He has authored four books based on his stand-up comedy and television monologues: The Rants (1996), Ranting Again (1999), I Rant, Therefore I Am (2000), and The Rant Zone (2001).

Miller has appeared in several films, in both comedic and non-comedic roles. His movie credits include Madhouse, Disclosure, The Net, Never Talk to Strangers, Bordello of Blood, What Happens in Vegas and Murder at 1600. He played the Howard Stern-like talk-radio host Zander Kelly in Joe Dirt (2001) and appeared as himself in Thank You for Smoking (2006).

Miller guest hosted the Slammy Awards episode of WWE Raw on December 14, 2009.

Comedic style

Miller has a laid-back style (for example, calling people "babe" or "cat") and an acerbic, brooding sense of humor. His specialty is the rant, which typically begin with "Now, I don't want to get off on a rant here, but..." and end with "...of course, that's just my opinion. I could be wrong."

Miller listed his comedic influences for The New York Times as including "Jonathan Miller, Richard Pryor, Richard Belzer and Mr. [Jay] Leno." When the Times asked him about the comedians Mort Sahl and Lenny Bruce, to whom he is often compared, Miller stated that he had been impressed with transcripts of Sahl's early work but that as Sahl's career continued he became too tied to the Kennedy family and became a "savage name-dropper," which diminished him in Miller's eyes, and served as an example for him to avoid. Miller had no respect for Bruce, telling the Times, "Lenny was a heroin addict, and I couldn't care less about heroin addicts. Once I hear a guy is a heroin addict, and they tell me he's a genius, I think, 'Really?' I'm not trying to be judgmental. But anybody whose last vision is of a tile pattern on a bathroom floor, I don't know what kind of genius they are."

Describing his career Miller stated, "It's all been built on arcane references, precision of language, and a reasonably imperturbable nature on TV. The basics are there, but I've been getting paid, making a living and having fun with it for next to 25 years, and you know that blows my mind that I've stuck with it. That's my favorite part of showbiz, hangin' in, knowing that something good is coming along. ... When I was starting, I thought I'd have to have a sword-in-the-stone moment of inspiration where I'd have to lay around for it to be visited on me. SNL was just a machine, and if you screwed two or three 'Updates' up, guess what, they have someone new and ready to go. So I learned how to pick up any newspaper and have five usable jokes in five minutes. "I don't ever wanna get self-important. I'm a comedian, and I want everyone in my life to know it. The stream-of-consciousness style is my monkey trick. I sit there, I watch stuff, and cultural references bump into my head. I watched a lot of TV when I was a kid."

Miller has referred to his casual stage-style as "quasi-Dean Martin insouciance." When asked if he has accepted others' title of him as "the 'intelligent' comedian," he replied, "The smartest thing I ever did was not buying into the fact that people thought I was smart. I was telling jokes about where I named the robot maid for The Jetsons. It's just a joke. I just did jokes. I never had my head up my ass that I mattered. I'm trying to get laughs... I'm OK [intelligence-wise]. I remember I had a writer once who told me—and we disagreed about everything, so I know he didn't think I was smart—but he said, 'I'll give you this. You have a deep drawer and a nice retrieval system.' I always thought that was a good appraisal of whatever limited comedy gift I had. I have a pretty good memory for pop arcana and a pretty quick retrieval system."

Personal life
Miller married Carolyn "Ali" Espley, a former model from Vancouver, British Columbia on April 24, 1988. Espley is best known as the girl in Kajagoogoo's 1983 "Too Shy" music video. The couple live in Santa Barbara and have two sons who were born in 1990 and 1993.

Political views
Although in his early years of fame it was perceived he was a staunch liberal and an outspoken critic of Republicans, in recent years Miller has become known for his neoconservative political opinions.

He was a regular political commentator on Fox News's The O'Reilly Factor in a segment called "Miller Time", and previously appeared on the network's Hannity & Colmes in a segment called "Real Free Speech."

Early outlook
When asked if his political outlook was a result of early influence by his parents, Miller told a reporter "I didn't know my dad—he moved out early. And my mom's politics were kind of hardscrabble. She didn't think about Democrats or Republicans. She thought about who made sense. I've been both in my life. Somebody can say they don't understand why somebody drifts. But I've always found people who drift interesting, 'cause it shows me the game's not stagnant in their own head. They're thinking."

During the late 1980s and continuing through the 1990s, Miller was generally perceived as a cynic on the left, eager to bash conservative Republicans.

The perception that Miller was a member of the political left did not change much, even when Miller told USA Today in 1995: "I might be profane and opinionated, but underneath all that are some pretty conservative feelings. On most issues, between Clinton and Newt Gingrich, I'd choose Newt in a second, even though he is a bit too exclusionary." Miller also declared himself a "conservative libertarian" in a 1996 Playboy interview.

Miller later told American Enterprise that one of the reasons he became more conservative was due to liberal critiques of Mayor Rudy Giuliani's approach to fighting crime in New York City, which began around 1994. "When I kept hearing liberals equating Giuliani with Hitler—that's when I really left the reservation. Even before 9/11, I'd travel to New York and say, 'Wow, this city certainly seems to be running better. Giuliani is the kind of leader I admire. When it's five below zero and you arrest somebody to get him inside off the street—that's not something Hitler would do. It made me realize that I was with the wrong group if that's what Hitler looked like to them."

Post September 11, 2001, attacks
Miller's ideology changed significantly in the years following the September 11, 2001, attacks. He called the attack "the biggest tragedy in the history of this country," and that it not only temporarily halted his comedy but made it difficult to talk. "I couldn't put together a sentence for two weeks, much less something pithy."

His convictions led him to become one of the few Hollywood celebrities backing George W. Bush and the war in Iraq. Miller has said that one of the defining moments, in addition to 9/11, for his move from the Democratic to the Republican Party was watching a 2004 primary debate between the nine Democrats then contending for their party's nomination. "I haven't seen a starting nine like that since the '62 Mets," he remarked.

In a 2007 interview with Bill O'Reilly, Miller spoke on the subject of his political outlook. "Well, listen. I must say that I never considered myself a secular progressive. ... I didn't consider myself that then, and I don't consider myself to be Curtis LeMay now. I have always thought of myself as a pragmatist. And I began to see a degree of certitude on the left that I found unsettling. I don't like lockstep, even if it's lockstep about being open-minded. And after 9/11, I remember thinking we might have to get into some preemptive measures here. And that seemed to put me—I don't know—off to the kids' table." He said that his more open conservatism may have cost him some passing acquaintances, but it has not affected "my dear friends. I certainly hope our friendship runs deeper than that. I still have some ultra-liberal friends."Slate commentator Dennis Cass describes Miller as having changed from a "left-leaning, Dada-ist wisenheimer" to a "tell-it-like-it-is, right-wing blowhard." The perceived change did not surprise former Saturday Night Live colleague and former Democratic Party Senator Al Franken: "People have said to me, 'What happened to Dennis?' Nothing happened to Dennis. He's the same Dennis. He's always had a conservative streak on certain issues." In a different interview Franken stated, "Dennis was always sort of conservative on certain kinds of issues. I am not quite sure why he decided to become a comedian with a dog in the fight, but as a comedian with a dog in the fight I sympathize with him."

While not at all shy about expressing his conservative views on topics such as taxes and foreign policy, Miller is quick to point out that he is still quite liberal on many social issues, including abortion and gay marriage. During a 2004 interview, Miller said "I've always been a pragmatist. If two gay guys want to get married, it's none of my business. I could care less [sic]. More power to them. I'm happy when people fall in love. But if some idiot foreign terrorist wants to blow up their wedding to make a political statement, I would rather kill him before he can do it, or have my country kill him before he can do it, instead of having him do it and punishing him after the fact. If that makes me a right-wing fanatic, I will bask in that assignation. ... I think abortion's wrong, but it's none of my business to tell somebody what's wrong. So I'm pro-choice. I want to keep my nose out of other people's personal business. I guess I fall into conservative when it comes to protecting the United States in a world where a lot of people hate the United States. ... [After 9/11] everybody should be in the protection business now. I can't imagine anybody not saying that. Well, I guess on the farthest end of the left they'd say, 'That's our fault.' And on the middle end they'd say, 'Well, there's another way to deal with it other than flat-out protecting ourselves.' I just don't believe that. People say we're the ones who make them hate us because of what we do. That's garbage to me. I think they're nuts. And you've got to protect yourself from nuts."

Along these same lines, Miller is open about his religious views, saying "I'm not a Christian, but I believe in God. Whether or not someone is pro-choice is none of my business. That's God's business. It's in His job description, not mine."

During an interview on The Tonight Show with Jay Leno, he said that he did not believe in global warming.

In a radio interview with Penn Jillette on September 22, 2006, Miller explained his libertarianism, saying, "...[a libertarian is] what I am, I'll be honest with you. I'm for gay marriage. I don't believe in abortion but I'm pro-choice 'cause it's none of my business. Pretty much anything goes with me if you're not infringing yourself on other people, but I'll tell ya, 9/11 changed me.... You gotta go around and explain it to people and they think you're a turncoat."

In a 2012 interview, Miller showed no concern over whether his political stance had made him less popular or robbed him of the credit of popularizing comedic rants, saying, "I'm a 58-year-old man and I'm happy where I'm at. I don't think about any of that. I go on O'Reilly once a week, I do my radio show and I go on the road about 20 dates a year. I've winnowed my crowd down to a select few who can support me. If you're 58 and you're still worrying about whether you're popular, what are you, in eighth grade? I must have started in earnest when I was 25 so I'm working on a quarter century here. I still talk and they give me green rectangles."

George W. Bush
An indication of Miller's political change can be seen in his view of President George W. Bush. Miller had previously joked about George W. Bush's intelligence in a July 31, 2000 interview about joining Monday Night Football, a Los Angeles Times reporter noted, "He shifted from Jim Brown to George W. Bush: 'God, the man thinks Croatia is the show that's on after Moesha.'" In another incident he joked, "Bush can't walk and fart at the same time." In January 2001 on his HBO series, Miller joked, "Condoleezza Rice has often been described as W's 'foreign policy tutor.' Oh, yeah, I love the sound of that. It's nice to know we're signing our nuclear arsenal over to a man who needs after-school help."

After 9/11, Miller's opinion had altered dramatically. In 2003 Miller told an interviewer that he was impressed by Bush for pursuing "the liquidation of terrorism," even though "that's not gonna be finished in his lifetime... But to take the first step? Ballsy." He felt it was likely that "the secular state of Iraq and Islamic fundamentalists cohabitate," as "they both think we're Satan." He concluded with, "I will say this, I feel more politically engaged than I've ever felt in my life because I do think we live in dangerous times, and anybody who looks at the world and says this is the time to be a wuss—I can't buy that anymore." Miller showed his commitment to Bush by speaking at the President's fund-raisers in Los Angeles and San Francisco. During this time, he jokingly referred to himself as "a Rat Pack of one for the president in Hollywood."Los Angeles Times noted that he was "raising his political profile" at this time, and that he "spoke out passionately in favor of the war in Iraq. He has made frequent appearances on conservative talk radio; he does weekly political commentary for Hannity & Colmes, a Fox News Channel talk show."

In 2003, The Weekly Standard called Miller "the loudest pro-Bush/pro-war voice in Hollywood", and quoted his comment on The Tonight Show with Jay Leno from February of that year. Miller advocated invading Iraq, and vented his displeasure at France's lack of support for the idea, saying, "I say we invade Iraq and then invade Chirac. You run a pipe—you run a pipe from the oil field right over this Eiffel Tower, shoot it up and have the world's biggest oil derrick. ... Listen, I would call the French scum bags, but that, of course, would be a disservice to bags filled with scum." That same year, The National Review wrote, "Conservatives ... have welcomed and even cheered the comedian's unabashed patriotism and endorsement of President Bush's foreign—and, in certain cases, domestic—policy." They noted that "During appearances on The Tonight Show, he has also advocated profiling at airports and oil-drilling in the Arctic National Wildlife Refuge."

On March 23, 2003 Michael Moore delivered an antiwar speech at the Academy Awards while accepting an Oscar for Bowling for Columbine. The speech in part accused the Bush administration of misleading the public in order to go into war, criticized the government's claims that Americans could secure their homes from biological, chemical or radiological attack by use of plastic sheeting and duct tape, and held the color alerts of the Homeland Security Advisory System as suspect. Moore stated, "We live in a time where we have a man sending us to war for fictitious reasons. Whether it's the fiction of duct tape or the fiction of orange alerts, we are against this war, Mr. Bush. Shame on you, Mr. Bush, shame on you." In response, Miller stated that when "we say that we love it [the USA] ... he's going to tell us what naive sheep we are and that he's the true patriot because he hates it and he sees all the problems in it. Michael Moore simultaneously represents everything I detest in a human being and everything I feel obligated to defend in an American. Quite simply, it is that stupid moron's right to be that utterly, completely wrong."

In May 2003, Miller was invited by The Wall Street Journal to write an opinion piece in response to Norman Mailer's anti-war commentary in the London Times that had appeared earlier in the month, and which had claimed, "With their dominance in sport, at work and at home eroded, Bush thought white American men needed to know they were still good at something. That's where Iraq came in..." Miller responded, "You know something, the only 'race' that really occurred to me during the war was our Army's sprint to Baghdad. ... And as Mr. Mailer's prostate gradually supplants his ego as the largest gland in his body, he's going to have to realize, as is the case with all young lions who inevitably morph into Bert Lahr, that his alleged profundities are now being perceived as the early predictors of dementia."

On Friday, June 27, 2003, President Bush made a 30-minute appearance at a $2,000-a-plate fundraiser luncheon for his re-election campaign at Burlingame, California, netting $1.6 million. Miller made an appearance, and was invited to ride in the Presidential limousine and fly on Air Force One so he could host the President's second fundraiser that day, a dinner at Los Angeles, where he appeared with Johnny Mathis and Kelsey Grammer. He mocked Democratic Governor of Vermont Howard Dean, who opposed the Iraq War and had entered the race days before, saying, "He can roll up his sleeves all he wants at public events, but as long as we see that heart tattoo with Neville Chamberlain's name on his right forearm, he's never going anywhere." Bush made a 35-minute speech at the LA fundraiser before leaving for Crawford, Texas, and the campaign made an additional $3.5 million. That night Miller made a (videotaped) debut appearance on Fox New's Hannity & Colmes.

In October 2003, Miller's interview with The American Enterprise was published where he praised Bush, saying, "He's much smarter than his enemies think he is. I think he's a genius. People whine about him getting into Yale—the way I see it, if your old man buys a building you should get into Yale! But I think he could have gotten into Yale on his own; he's a very smart man. ... The fact that midway through his life he realized he was drinking too much and screwing up and stopped it—that's more impressive than what college he attended. What he did is a fine accomplishment, and I think it's putting him in touch with his God. ... In this messed up world, I like seeing my President pray. I don't think a person can get answers out of books anymore. This is an infinitely complex world, and at some point one has to have faith in one's religion. I find it endearing that President Bush prays to God and that he's not an agnostic or an atheist. I'm glad there's someone higher that he has to answer to."

In the AE interview, Miller was asked about the outrage and public destruction of their music CDs that occurred as a response to the Dixie Chicks' Natalie Maines criticizing Bush at one of their concerts, when she said, "We're ashamed that the President of the United States is from Texas." Miller stated, "The Dixie Chicks got exactly what they deserved. In a time of war, to go on foreign soil [London, England] and decry your President should probably cause a hue and cry. When it first happened, I thought, "I'm never going to buy another one of their albums." And then I thought, "You know what, I've never bought one of their albums—I don't like their music."

Miller sat in the gallery at President Bush's State of the Union address on January 21, 2004.

In 2004, while Miller prepared to host his CNBC program, he told The Associated Press that his show was not going to do any jokes about George W. Bush, explaining, "I like him. I'm going to give him a pass. I take care of my friends." Miller explained further in a 2008 interview: "I thought it was so integral that he got re-elected that I laid off him for awhile. There's something to be said for standing up in front of a roomful of press and saying I'm not going to do Bush jokes. At least it was honest, and I could see they were gobsmacked. There's jokes I get presented with everyday that I'll take out because they're ripping on people I know. Guess what, if they're my friend, I pull it out. I'm not interested in hurting people, and it's not just because of 9/11."

Reflecting on his thoughts near the end of Bush's second term in 2007, Miller still had good words when talking about Bush. "After 9/11 it was a different world. One where crazies strap a bomb to their kids in the name of religion. Bush and (Rudy) Giuliani were fearless leaders during the national crisis. Thank God Bush chose to stay on the offense."

Candidacy consideration
In 2003, Rob Stutzman and other members of the leadership for the Californian Republican party, after seeing the political success of Arnold Schwarzenegger, approached Miller in an effort to draft him to challenge Democratic Senator Barbara Boxer. Miller had supported Schwarzenegger's candidacy, even acting as its post-debate spokesperson after the Sacramento gubernatorial debate on September 24, 2003. He went on to speak at a Schwarzenegger rally that same night. It was there that he confirmed his now famous love of eggs and stated, "Let the world know, I am mad about eggs!"

When asked about the possibility of facing a Miller candidacy, Boxer spokesman Roy Behr dismissed his odds: "The Republican Party has gone through a desperate search to find someone who is remotely credible—they've looked at everybody and everything, and they couldn't find anybody, so they're looking at bringing in the circus. I think the public has always registered how they feel about Dennis Miller. And that's why he got booted off Monday Night Football."The Weekly Standards Bill Whalen saw that, with the ascent of Schwarzenegger, other celebrities were considering political careers (such as Republican Kelsey Grammer). Examining Miller's chances for the Senate seat the Standard pointed out that it was "hard to imagine a candidate quicker on the draw or more withering in a debate." But the piece went on to note that other Republican celebrities made the transition to elected politician (Schwarzenegger, Ronald Reagan, Sonny Bono), because they "embodied optimism." Miller, the Standard proclaimed, was seen in contrast as "both terribly erudite... and decidedly yuppie (the comedian endorses DirecTV and Amstel Light...) Not to mention a little too edgy for some Republicans." The Standard noted that he had been booed by some in the Republican audience during his Los Angeles fund-raiser for President Bush when he said Democratic "West Virginia senator Robert Byrd 'must be burning the cross at both ends'." Miller had responded "'Well, he was in the Klan. Boo me, but he was in the Klan.'" The Standard said "he'd be an HBO politician trying to play to a T.G.I. Friday's electorate."

When asked about Miller's chances, Martin Kaplan, director of USC's Norman Lear Center theorized that Miller might face a tough primary battle to win the Republican nomination from other members of the party that had actual political experience. He told a reporter that while Miller did have good name recognition, unlike Schwarzenegger he did not have the ability to "chill the enthusiasm of other Republicans from getting into the race."

By November 2003, The New York Times did a piece on the Republican opposition to Boxer and reported that "Mr. Miller was never serious about the idea, Republican officials who spoke with him say. ... 'Dennis has never contacted us,' said George M. Sundheim III, chairman of the state Republican Party". The Times pointed out that while the Republican Party was talking about drafting him, Miller "had signed a multiyear contract with CNBC as a political talk show host."

Miller, invoking his pleasant home life in Santa Barbara with his wife and two children later told The New York Times, "They inquired about my availability to run against Barbara Boxer, but I'm not at the point where I would consider it." He expanded on the subject in an interview with Time magazine saying he had declined the draft offer because "At some point that involves moving to Washington, D.C., sitting in a room all day with a moron like Barbara Boxer. I'm just not interested. I like open minds, and I think in Washington right now, we might as well start painting those people red and blue." He told the Associated Press, "Maybe when I get older I would think about it, just as a lark, view it as its own form of a TV show. I think it would be fun to get in there and turn out the whole process—just refuse to play, and don't budge. Get rid of me if you want, but I'm just going to do what I want."

Saturday Night Live 40th anniversary
Miller did not appear on the 2015 show for the 40th anniversary of Saturday Night Live, and rumors spread that he and fellow alum Victoria Jackson had not been invited due to their conservative political activism. He took to Twitter to dispel the claims, saying Lorne Michaels was classy, well-mannered and invited everyone, but he declined. He later told an interviewer that he would have loved to be there, but could not due to family commitments.

Political support
In 1988, Miller voted for George H. W. Bush, a fact he brought up in 1992 as proof that he was "essentially conservative."

In 1992, Miller, who had endorsed the candidacy of Jerry Brown during the Democratic primaries, moved his support to Independent candidate Ross Perot. Miller volunteered for Ross Perot's candidacy at his San Fernando Valley campaign office. Miller told a reporter, "I don't know that you need to know that much about him. He's an outsider, and the two-party system is going to hell." Miller stated that he had become "really grossed out by the system after observing the behavior of politicians in both parties during the confirmation hearings of Justice Clarence Thomas.

When Ross Perot dropped out of the Presidential race on July 16, 1992, saying he feared a conspiracy against his family, many began to joke about his sanity. On July 30, 1995, Miller told a reporter, "I'd vote for him [Perot] tomorrow. I don't think he's a genius but I love the thought of him at State Dinners mistaking the Queen of Denmark for Kaye Ballard. People say to me, 'You wouldn't want Ross Perot with his finger on the button.' But believe me, they would never let Ross Perot near the real button. They would rig up a stunt button for him, and if he ever pressed it, it would squirt him in the face with milk or something."

In 1995, considering the candidates for president, Miller told a reporter, "I don't respect Bill Clinton. He's the same as [George H. W.] Bush or [Bob] Dole. Clinton's my age, and I know how full of shit I am. So I look at him and think, 'I know you. You're the guy who used to tap the keg.'" He continued to mock Clinton when he won the Presidency, and later admitted to voting for Bob Dole in the 1996 election (despite Perot being on the ballot in every state).

On February 21, 2007, while appearing as a guest on The O'Reilly Factor, and again on May 25, 2007, while appearing as a guest on The Tonight Show, Miller stated that he initially supported Rudy Giuliani for president in 2008. After Giuliani's departure from the race he redirected his support to John McCain. Miller said that he gave Barack Obama six to eight months before forming an opinion on him, because he saw that his election was inspiring to black youth and hoped it would be healing. He came to the conclusion that Obama was mostly hype, and in actuality, "He's an inept civil servant who stinks."

Miller endorsed Herman Cain in the 2012 Republican primary, but later dropped his support, saying of Cain, "He can't win!" He later campaigned for Mitt Romney in the general election. After the Presidential election of 2012, Miller appeared on Fox News and said that under Obama, the US is on the road to the "European model".

In 2016, Miller did not endorse any particular Republican primary candidate. By December 16, 2015, he told Bill O'Reilly, "I would vote for any of them over Hillary, except for Lindsey Graham who is like a varicose Charlie Crist. I get the feeling he's out the door when he gets a chance. And Pataki, who I shared an elevator with once and he is a creepy, creepy drip. But other than that I would vote for any of those people over Hillary." Miller became a strong supporter of Donald Trump in the 2016 U.S. general election, addressing a tweet to Republicans who were uncertain after Trump wrapped up the nomination: "Don't kid yourself. At this point, any vote for anyone that is not Donald Trump is a vote for Hillary Clinton. Also, both Presidential boxes left blank is a vote for Hillary Clinton because, as mindless as Liberals can be, even they don't enter into suicide pacts with that petulant, whiny part of themselves. If that is your wont, fine... do it! But don't bullsh__ yourself. You're electing Hillary Clinton because you want to elect Hillary Clinton."

Media

Film
 Madhouse (1990) – Wes
 Disclosure (1994) – Mark Lewyn
 The Net (1995) – Dr. Alan Champion
 Never Talk to Strangers (1995) – Cliff Raddison
 Bordello of Blood (1996) – Rafe Guttman
 Murder at 1600 (1997) – Detective Steve Stengel
 Joe Dirt (2001) – Zander Kelly
 Thank You for Smoking (2005) – himself
 What Happens in Vegas (2008) – Judge Whopper
 The Campaign (2012) – himself
 Joe Dirt 2 (2015) – Zander Kelly

TV shows
 "MTV Movie Awards" (1992) - himself/host
 "The Dennis Miller Show" (1992) - himself
 Dennis Miller Live (1994- 2002) - himself
 Space Ghost Coast to Coast (2003) – himself
 Boston Public (2003) – Charlie Bixby
 House of Cards (2013) – himself

Comedy specials
 Mr. Miller Goes to Washington (1988)
 The 13th Annual Young Comedians Special (1989) (host)
 The Earth Day Special (1990)
 Black & White (1990)
 Live from Washington, D.C.: They Shoot HBO Specials, Don't They? (1993)
 State of the Union Undressed (1995)
 Citizen Arcane (1996)
 The Millennium Special: 1,000 Years, 100 Laughs, 10 Really Good Ones (1999)
 The Raw Feed (2003)
 Dennis Miller: All In (2006)
 The Big Speech (2010)
 America 180 (2014)
 Fake News, Real Jokes (2018)

Audio
 The Off-White Album (Warner Records, 1988)
 The Rants (Random House Audio, 1996)
 Ranting Again (Random House Audio, 1998)
 Rants Redux (Random House Audio, 1999)
 I Rant, Therefore I Am (Random House Audio, 2000)
 The Rant Zone: An All-Out Blitz Against Soul-Sucking Jobs, Twisted Child Stars, Holistic Loons, and People Who Eat Their Dogs! (HarperAudio, 2001)
 Still Ranting After All These Years (HarperAudio, 2004)
 America 180 (New Wave Dynamics 2014)

Print
 The Rants (Doubleday, 1996) 
 Ranting Again (Doubleday, 1999) 
 I Rant, Therefore I Am (Doubleday, 2000) 
 The Rant Zone: An All-Out Blitz Against Soul-Sucking Jobs, Twisted Child Stars, Holistic Loons, and People Who Eat Their Dogs!'' (HarperCollins, 2001)

References

External links

 
 Annotated Dennis Miller Archive
 Real Detroit Weekly Interview

1953 births
Living people
20th-century American comedians
21st-century American comedians
American comedy writers
American satirists
American game show hosts
American libertarians
American male comedians
American podcasters
American sketch comedians
American stand-up comedians
American talk radio hosts
American television talk show hosts
Conservative talk radio
Primetime Emmy Award winners
KDKA people
Warner Records artists
National Football League announcers
Writers from Pittsburgh
Point Park University alumni
Male actors from Pittsburgh
Fox News people
American political commentators
CNBC people
Pennsylvania Republicans
20th-century American non-fiction writers
21st-century American non-fiction writers
American people of Scottish descent